Beaver Run is a stream in Coshocton County, in the U.S. state of Ohio.

Beaver Run was named after Beaver County, Pennsylvania, the native home of a first settler.

See also
List of rivers of Ohio

References

Rivers of Coshocton County, Ohio
Rivers of Ohio